Grow Up, Tony Phillips is a 2013 comedy film by American director Emily Hagins and her fourth feature film. It was first released on October 31, 2013 at the South by Southwest film festival and stars Tony Vespe as Tony Phillips, a young teenager's love for Halloween. Unlike her prior feature-length films, Grow Up, Tony Phillips does not feature any supernatural elements seen in past films such as Pathogen or My Sucky Teen Romance.

Synopsis
Tony (Tony Vespe) is conflicted. He loves Halloween, but this year all of his high school friends have decided that Halloween is too juvenile for him. What is Tony to do when nobody his age really understands what Halloween means to him?

Cast
Tony Vespe as Tony Phillips
Caleb Barwick as Mikey
Devin Bonnée as Craig
AJ Bowen as Pete
Seth Lee as Brian Cooper
Byron Brown as Gary
Janet Travis as Claire
Korey Coleman as Principal Blackman
Arthur Dale as Young Tony
Katie Folger as Elle
Tanner Fontana	as Young Craig
Catherine Ann Hicks as Trick-or-Treater
Trevon D. Anderson as Trick-or-Treater
Emmet Barwick as Trick-or-Treater
Paris Cudini as Trick-or-Treater
Hunter Cudini as Trick-or-Treater
Alyssa Michelle Jimenez as Teenage Partier, Dance Crowd

Production
Funding for Grow Up, Tony Phillips was partially raised through a successful Kickstarter campaign, which raised $75,000. While writing the script, Hagins wanted to focus on the transition between adult and child that occurs with Halloween, which she felt was often overlooked in many films. The script was a departure the genre from her previous films, as the dark tones depressed her and Hagins wanted to "a movie that had no genre at all". In 2012 AJ Bowen was confirmed to be performing in the film. Filming began in mid-November 2012 in Austin, Texas. Hagins experienced some difficulty with shooting, as some businesses already had Christmas decorations up but decided to work them into the script as a plot point.

Reception
Critical reception for Grow Up, Tony Phillips was mostly positive. Common criticisms revolved around the film's storytelling, as some reviewers such as Film School Rejects felt that there were "some serious story elements that are left dangling in all but the most superficial ways", which interfered with a film that they otherwise enjoyed. Hagins received praise for the film's acting and for what the Daily Texan saw as "genuine truths about how high school can dissolve the most intense friendships". Vox and Twitch Film both gave mostly positive reviews, with Twitch Film praising the movie's cinematography and film score.

References

External links
 

2013 films
2010s coming-of-age comedy films
2013 independent films
American coming-of-age comedy films
American independent films
American films about Halloween
Films directed by Emily Hagins
Films shot in Texas
Kickstarter-funded films
2013 comedy films
2010s English-language films
2010s American films